Matthew McCarthy (born 14 December 1981) is a former Australian rules footballer  for the Geelong Football Club in the Australian Football League (AFL), playing 22 games between 2003 and 2006. He is the brother of deceased Port Adelaide player John McCarthy.

External links
 

1981 births
Living people
Geelong Football Club players
Old Xaverians Football Club players
Australian rules footballers from Victoria (Australia)